The 1970 Daytona 500 was a NASCAR Grand National Series race held on February 22, 1970, at Daytona International Speedway in Daytona Beach, Florida.

First Daytona 500 starts for Joe Frasson, Dick Trickle, Tommy Gale, Ron Keselowski, and Jim Vandiver. Only Daytona 500 start for Butch Hirst, Paul Feldner, Ron Grana, and Leonard Blanchard. Last Daytona 500 starts for Richard Brickhouse, Roy Mayne, and Dr. Don Tarr.

Summary
NASCAR's modern era would commence with this race. Winged, aerodynamic cars built specifically for high-speed superspeedway racing such as the Plymouth Superbird and Ford Torino Talladega made their debut. Pete Hamilton, hired by Petty Enterprises shortly before the season, won the race in the #40 Plymouth Superbird just three car lengths over David Pearson, after passing him with nine laps to go. It was the first win for the new Plymouth Superbird.

This race would last 200 minutes, with an audience of 103,800 people watching. A grand total of 24 lead changes were made with an average green flag run of 22 laps. 23% of the race was held under a yellow flag; blown engines were the primary culprit behind the caution periods.

On lap 7, Cecil Gordon and Richard Petty blew their engines. Jim Vandiver blew his engine on lap 15 while Cale Yarborough would do the same thing on lap 32. A. J. Foyt would also blow his engine on lap 58 while Buddy Arrington wrecked his vehicle on lap 77 by crashing it into a wall. The final caution the race came when Dick Brooks blew his engine on lap 181.

Buddy Arrington had a brand new #5 Dodge Daytona for the 1970 season but totaled it out here with a hard crash at full speed into the outside wall. He hit the wall so hard the big wing on the Charger actually broke with its top cross bar ripping off the car then flying 60 feet down the track spinning in the air.

Following the wreck NASCAR mandated that all of the wing cars would have to have a steel cable to anchor the wing to the frame to avoid a repeat of this incident. John Sears actually drove under the flying piece of Arrington's wing as it soared over the track. He was apparently quite scared it was going to hit him. Arrington later said this was the worst wreck of his entire NASCAR career; as it left him with several broken ribs and a ruptured spleen. The Daytona 500 was not a race that Buddy Arrington would finish in good form; finishing in 29th place after qualifying in 32nd place. Arrington eventually got back on the track a few months later at the 1970 Rebel 400. 

David Pearson tried to slingshot Pete Hamilton in the last turn, but got very loose and finished second.

References

Daytona 500
Daytona 500
Daytona 500
NASCAR races at Daytona International Speedway